The Montilla Government was the regional government of Catalonia led by President José Montilla between 2006 and 2010. It was formed in November 2006 following the regional election and ended in December 2010 following the regional election.

Executive Council

Other appointments

Notes

References
 

2006 establishments in Catalonia
2010 disestablishments in Catalonia
Cabinets established in 2006
Cabinets disestablished in 2010
Cabinets of Catalonia